Saturation is the debut album of Vas Deferens Organization, released in 1996 through Aether Records.

Track listing

Personnel 
Adapted from the Saturation liner notes.
Vas Deferens Organization
Matt Castille – instruments, production, engineering
Eric Lumbleau – instruments, production, cover art
Production and additional personnel
Jim Edgerton – guitar, sitar
Jim Goodall – drums on "Rickshaw Grande-Prix"
Brad Laner – bass guitar and drums on "Rickshaw Grande-Prix"

Release history

References 

1996 debut albums
Vas Deferens Organization albums